The following is a list of the 36 communes of the Hauts-de-Seine department of France.

Since January 2016, all communes of Hauts-de-Seine are part of the intercommunality Métropole du Grand Paris

Hauts-de-Seine